The Fermilab Holometer in Illinois is intended to be the world's most sensitive laser interferometer, surpassing the sensitivity of the GEO600 and LIGO systems, and theoretically able to detect holographic fluctuations in spacetime.

According to the director of the project, the Holometer should be capable of detecting fluctuations in the light of a single attometer, meeting or exceeding the sensitivity required to detect the smallest units in the universe called Planck units.  Fermilab states: "Everyone is familiar these days with the blurry and pixelated images, or noisy sound transmission, associated with poor internet bandwidth. The Holometer seeks to detect the equivalent blurriness or noise in reality itself, associated with the ultimate frequency limit imposed by nature."

Craig Hogan, a particle astrophysicist at Fermilab, states about the experiment, "What we’re looking for is when the lasers lose step with each other. We’re trying to detect the smallest unit in the universe. This is really great fun, a sort of old-fashioned physics experiment where you don’t know what the result will be."

Experimental physicist Hartmut Grote of the Max Planck Institute in Germany states that although he is skeptical that the apparatus will successfully detect the holographic fluctuations, if the experiment is successful "it would be a very strong impact to one of the most open questions in fundamental physics. It would be the first proof that space-time, the fabric of the universe, is quantized."

Holometer has started, in 2014, collecting data that will help determine whether the universe fits the holographic principle.
The hypothesis that holographic noise may be observed in this manner has been criticized on the grounds that the theoretical framework used to derive the noise violates Lorentz-invariance. Lorentz-invariance violation is however very strongly constrained already, an issue that has been very unsatisfactorily addressed in the mathematical treatment.

The Fermilab holometer has found also other uses than studying the holographic fluctuations of spacetime. It has shown constraints on the existence of high-frequency gravitational waves and primordial black holes.

Experimental description

The Holometer will consist of two 39 m arm-length power-recycled Michelson interferometers, similar to the LIGO instruments. The interferometers will be able to be operated in two spatial configurations, termed "nested" and "back-to-back". According to Hogan's hypothesis, in the nested configuration the interferometers' beamsplitters should appear to wander in step with each other (that is, the wandering should be correlated); conversely, in the back-to-back configuration any wandering of the beamsplitters should be uncorrelated. The presence or absence of the correlated wandering effect in each configuration can be determined by cross-correlating the interferometers' outputs.

The experiment started one year of data collection in August 2014. A paper about the project titled Now Broadcasting in Planck Definition by Craig Hogan ends with the statement "We don't know what we will find."

A new result of the experiment released on December 3, 2015, after a year of data collection, has ruled out Hogan's theory of a pixelated universe to a high degree of statistical significance (4.6 sigma). The study found that space-time is not quantized at the scale being measured.

References

External links
Fermilab Holometer

Science and technology in the United States
Experimental physics
Experimental particle physics
Fermilab
2014 inventions
Fermilab experiments